The Fuego River is a river of Argentina. It is located on the island of Tierra del Fuego.

See also
List of rivers of Argentina

References

 Rand McNally, The New International Atlas, 1993.
  GEOnet Names Server 

Rivers of Argentina
Rivers of Tierra del Fuego Province, Argentina